Classified Records was an independent record label based in San Francisco, California, that released music by Jocelyn Enriquez, Pinay, Julie Plug, M:G, Drop 'n Harmony, as well as the Serenade compilation series. The label was founded by Kormann Roque, Elvin Reyes, and Rino Que in 1993. Classified Records was well known within the Filipino community since many staff members and recording artists were of Filipino descent.

The first release was the debut album by Jocelyn Enriquez, who became popular with her hit records "I've Been Thinking About You", "Do You Miss Me?", and "A Lil' Bit of Ecstasy" produced by Glenn Gutierrez. The label's other notable singles included "Is It Real" by Pinay along with "Sweet Honesty" and "What Do You Remember" by M:G. All of these charted on Billboard magazine. R&B male group Drop N Harmony and alternative band Julie Plug rounded out their roster. Julie Plug remains a legendary staple in the San Francisco indie band scene. Classified released 3 slowjam CDs called "Serenade" that featured slowjams by Filipino American artists across the globe that garnered a strong following from its Filipino American fanbase.

After a brief joint venture with Tommy Boy Records, the original Classified Records closed its doors in 2001 with a few Classified executives and producers starting their own indie labels. Producer/songwriters JP Nebres, Matt Villacarte, and Glenn Gutierrez partnered to form Planet Hype, releasing music by singer-songwriter Sharyn Maceren, Pinay, Ace High (a hip-hop trio that included Traxamillion) and Drop 'n Harmony (DnH). Planet Hype also provides mixing, mastering and production services as well as serving as a digital distribution solution for a number of independent artists, including American Idol contestants Todrick Hall, Charity Vance, and Sway Penala. Former Classified Records executive Reno Ursal started his own label, Rhythm Drive Records, releasing music by Malyssa and Alvendia. Ursal's Young Adult novel "Enlightenment" Book 1 of The Bathala Series was released in 2019 winning multiple literary awards.

In 2006, CJ Harris purchased the license to the name "Classified Records." The new incarnation of Classified Records is based in San Diego, California with CJ Harris as its CEO. Since starting the label, Harris has partnered with William Banks, former manager of hip hop group Different Breed and collaborated with Syndicate Music Collective to build a network and community of San Diego musicians. They formed the Minds of Nine, which has have hosted musicians at the Onyx Room.

 Artists: Crisstyle, Mac Chi, Tiah!, B Martini, Ironic, Posted, Grizzo, Truth, The Futuristic Moguls, Stella Donna, Justice, .
 Managers: Banks, Nate Moulder
 Producers: C.J. Harris, DaVinci, Delvees, DJ Marcu, RevelaShaun 6:8,

American independent record labels